Metallaxis semiustus is a species of moth in the family Geometridae first described by Charles Swinhoe in 1894. It is found in the north-eastern parts of the Himalayas and Borneo.

External links

Rhodostrophiini
Sterrhinae
Moths of Borneo
Moths described in 1894